Det Schubotheske Forlag was a Danish publishing house. It was founded in 1728 by Frantz Christian Mumme. It was disestablished in 1909. Some of the publications were written in Icelandic or Old Norse.

References

Book publishing companies of Denmark
Defunct mass media companies of Denmark
Danish companies established in 1728
Publishing companies disestablished in 1909
1909 disestablishments in Denmark